The Chengdu campaign  was a campaign fought between the Communists and the Nationalists during the Chinese Civil War in the post World War II era and resulted in Communist victory and capture of Chengdu, national capital of the Republic of China and provincial capital of the southwestern Chinese province of Sichuan. The campaign was part of the Southwestern China campaign.

Battle of Jianmenguan
Jianmen Pass (Jianmen Guan, 剑门关) was one of the key gateways of Sichuan.  There are 72 peaks in the range and the only road going through the mountains was 50 metres wide. Whoever controlled this 2 km long stretch of the road controlled the gateway of Sichuan, and the Nationalists had built an elaborate system of bunkers in the area to strengthen its defense against the expected communist invasion.

After taking the city of Guangyuan on December 14, 1949, the communists decided that Jianmen Pass (Jianmen Guan, 剑门关) must be taken.  The 540th Regiment of the 180th Division of 60th Army of the communist 18th Army Group was tasked with this job and after three days of forced march of more than 40 km in the mountain, the communist 540th Regiment reached Jianmen Pass.  The communist 540th Regiment immediately launched its assault on the pass by first completely annihilating a company from the retreating nationalist 55th Division tasked to strengthen the defense.  Later, one of the battalions of the communist regiment was sent to outflank the defenders by traversing mountain terrain which was considered impossible by the local populace, including the defenders.  The other two battalions of the communist regiment crawled forward along the ravine under the cover of darkness, and by 10:00 PM, they were within 50 metres of the pass.  The attackers then launched their assault in darkness under the cover of heavy fire, and with the help of the battalion that outflanked the defenders, they were able to cross the last ravine via a log and overwhelmed the defenders.  With Jianmen Pass falling into enemy hands, the Nationalists had no choice but to retreat and abandon the town of Jiange (剑阁) in the afternoon of December 18, 1949.

The Communists managed to capture over 300 prisoners-of-war and had all the remaining people killed in the fierce battle, and more importantly, the taking of Jianmen Pass (Jianmen Guan, 剑门关) secured the passage for the communists to invade deeper into the heart of Sichuan.

Order of battle
 Nationalists
 A regiment of local garrison
 A company from the retreating 55th Division
 Communists
 The 540th Regiment of the 180th Division of 60th Army of the XVIII Corps

Strength 
Nationalists: 1000
Communists: 800

Casualties 
Nationalists: 500 killed, 300 captured
Communists: Unknown

See also
List of battles of the Chinese Civil War
National Revolutionary Army
History of the People's Liberation Army
Chinese Civil War

References
Zhu, Zongzhen and Wang, Chaoguang, Liberation War History, 1st Edition, Social Scientific Literary Publishing House in Beijing, 2000,  (set)
Zhang, Ping, History of the Liberation War, 1st Edition, Chinese Youth Publishing House in Beijing, 1987,  (pbk.)
Jie, Lifu, Records of the Liberation War: The Decisive Battle of Two Kinds of Fates, 1st Edition, Hebei People's Publishing House in Shijiazhuang, 1990,  (set)
Literary and Historical Research Committee of the Anhui Committee of the Chinese People's Political Consultative Conference, Liberation War, 1st Edition, Anhui People's Publishing House in Hefei, 1987, 
Li, Zuomin, Heroic Division and Iron Horse: Records of the Liberation War, 1st Edition, Chinese Communist Party History Publishing House in Beijing, 2004, 
Wang, Xingsheng, and Zhang, Jingshan, Chinese Liberation War, 1st Edition, People's Liberation Army Literature and Art Publishing House in Beijing, 2001,  (set)
Huang, Youlan, History of the Chinese People's Liberation War, 1st Edition, Archives Publishing House in Beijing, 1992, 
Liu Wusheng, From Yan'an to Beijing: A Collection of Military Records and Research Publications of Important Campaigns in the Liberation War, 1st Edition, Central Literary Publishing House in Beijing, 1993, 
Tang, Yilu and Bi, Jianzhong, History of Chinese People's Liberation Army in Chinese Liberation War, 1st Edition, Military Scientific Publishing House in Beijing, 1993 – 1997,  (Volum 1), 7800219615 (Volum 2), 7800219631 (Volum 3), 7801370937 (Volum 4), and 7801370953 (Volum 5)

1949 in China
Conflicts in 1949
Battles of the Chinese Civil War
History of Chengdu
Military history of Sichuan